"A Woman Lives for Love" is a song written by George Richey, Glenn Sutton, and Norro Wilson. It was recorded and released as a single by American country, rock, and Christian artist, Wanda Jackson.

The song was recorded at the Columbia Recording Studio on December 11, 1969, in Nashville, Tennessee, United States. "A Woman Lives for Love" was officially released as a single in March 1970, peaking at number seventeen on the Billboard Magazine Hot Country Singles chart. The song was issued on Jackson's 1970 studio album of the same name.

The song earned Jackson a Grammy award nomination for Best Female Country Vocal Performance in 1971. Jackson lost the award to Lynn Anderson for her monster hit ""Rose Garden." Ironically, "A Woman Lives for Love" may be best known by its cover version recorded by Anderson (who husband at the time was married to co-writer Sutton) which appeared on three albums in the early 1970s "Stay There Til I Get There", The World of Lynn Anderson, and the budget album also titled "A Woman Lives For Love".

Chart performance

References 

1970 singles
Wanda Jackson songs
Songs written by George Richey
Songs written by Glenn Sutton
Songs written by Norro Wilson
Song recordings produced by George Richey
1970 songs
Capitol Records singles